KZGZ (97.5 FM) — branded as Power 98 — is an rhythmic-leaning contemporary hit radio-formatted station broadcasting from the village of Hagåtña in the United States territory of Guam. It is owned and operated by Sorensen Media Group. It signed on the air on February 23, 1993.

DJs

Current 
 Dice
 Leezah
 Jewels

Former 
Kristina "Kai" Young
Kyle Mandapat
Tori Santos
"Shimmy Shack" Washington
Reese "The Beast" Espinosa
Johna "DJ Suki"
Chad Sebastian
Totally Tony
Frankie Free
Intern Aaron
DJ Patch
Izzy BIzzy
Chef ED

External links

Rhythmic contemporary radio stations in the United States
ZGZ
Radio stations established in 1993
1993 establishments in Guam
Hagåtña, Guam